Game & Watch games have had many different re-releases.

The Game & Watch Gallery series, known in Japan and Australia as the  series, is a series of compilations of some of Nintendo's original Game & Watch titles first released in 1995. Five installments have been released, all for systems in the Game Boy line; four of these games have also been released on the Virtual Console for Nintendo 3DS and Wii U. From Game & Watch Gallery onward, the games feature Game & Watch games in two styles: Classic, which features faithful reproductions of the original games, and Modern, which gives the games a different visual style using characters from the Mario series; however, not all Game & Watch games included in a particular game include a Modern style. Also, the titles often feature actual galleries explaining the history of the Game & Watch system and the various games released for it. The first four titles in the series also feature Super Game Boy borders which mimic the original Game & Watch casing designs. While originally released under the title Game Boy Gallery in Australia, the Virtual Console releases use the title Game & Watch Gallery.

Beginning in 1998, Nintendo licensed a series of small standalone LCD remakes of the original Game & Watch games called Nintendo Mini Classics.

In the early 2000s, several Game & Watch titles were planned for re-release as Game & Watch-e (a series of Nintendo e-Reader cards); however, only Manhole was released.

The Game & Watch Collection series for Nintendo DS is a set of two games that were available exclusively from Club Nintendo.

Digital versions of the games were created as DSiWare which was released for Nintendo DSi in 2009 (2010 internationally) and for Nintendo 3DS in 2011.

Games featured

Game & Watch Gallery series

Game Boy Gallery
Game Boy Gallery: 5 games in 1 is the first game in the series and by far the simplest. It was released for the Game Boy in Europe on April 27, 1995 and in Australia in 1995. Unlike other games in the series, this game has neither Modern nor Classic modes; the looks are "Modern" with generic characters, but the gameplay is "Classic"-style. It is also the only game in the series in which highscores are not saved when the console is turned off. It features five games and is the only title in the series not to be re-released on Virtual Console. Players can choose between two difficulty levels: A (easy), and B (hard). The game sounds can also be set to Modern (music and original sound effects) or Classic (original sound effects only).

List of games
 Ball
 Vermin
 Flagman
 Manhole
 Cement Factory

Game & Watch Gallery

It was released for the Game Boy in Japan on February 1, 1997, in the United States on May 5, 1997, in Europe on August 28, 1997, and in Australia in 1997; it was released for the Nintendo Power for the Game Boy in Japan on March 1, 2000.

It was released on the Nintendo 3DS Virtual Console in Japan on June 22, 2011, in North America on July 14, 2011, and in Europe and Australia on July 21, 2011; while it was originally released under the title Game Boy Gallery 2 in Australia, the Virtual Console release uses the title Game & Watch Gallery.

This game features Game & Watch games in two styles: Classic, which features faithful reproductions of the original games, and Modern, which gives the games a different visual style using characters from the Mario series. It features four games.

List of games
 Manhole
 Fire
 Octopus
 Oil Panic

The game also includes a museum feature, where the player can view screenshots of several Game & Watch games, including Game & Watch games that cannot be played in this game. The games listed include:

 Ball
 Flagman
 Vermin
 Fire
 Judge
 Manhole
 Helmet
 Lion
 Parachute
 Octopus
 Chef
 Turtle Bridge
 Fire Attack
 Mario Bros.
 Mario's Cement Factory
 Boxing

Game & Watch Gallery 2

It was released for the Game Boy in Japan on September 27, 1997; it was released for the Game Boy Color in the United States on November 20, 1998, in Europe on November 1, 1998, and in Australia in 1998; it was released for the Nintendo Power for the Game Boy in Japan on March 1, 2000.

The Game Boy version was released on the Nintendo 3DS Virtual Console in Japan on March 21, 2012. The Game Boy Color version was released on the Nintendo 3DS Virtual Console in Europe and Australia on May 3, 2012 and in North America on May 24, 2012; while it was originally released under the title Game Boy Gallery 3 in Australia, the Virtual Console release uses the title Game & Watch Gallery 2.

This game features Game & Watch games in two styles: Classic, which features faithful reproductions of the original games, and Modern, which gives the games a different visual style using characters from the Mario series. It features six games.

List of games
 Parachute
 Helmet
 Chef
 Vermin
 Donkey Kong
 Ball (unlockable)

The game also includes a museum feature, where the player can view screenshots of several Game & Watch games, including Game & Watch games that cannot be played in this game. The games listed include:

 Donkey Kong
 Oil Panic
 Green House
 Lifeboat
 Donkey Kong Jr.
 Tropical Fish
 Rain Shower
 Spitball Sparky

The museum entries from the previous game can also be unlocked.

Game & Watch Gallery 3

It was released for the Game Boy Color in Japan on April 8, 1999, in the United States on December 6, 1999, in Australia in 1999, and in Europe on February 1, 2000; it was released for the Nintendo Power for the Game Boy in Japan on March 1, 2000. While it was released for the Game Boy Color, it is also compatible with the Game Boy.

It was released on the Nintendo 3DS Virtual Console in Europe and Australia on September 25, 2014, and in North America on February 5, 2015; while it was originally released under the title Game Boy Gallery 4 in Australia, the Virtual Console release uses the title Game & Watch Gallery 3. In Japan, it was released on the Nintendo 3DS Virtual Console, but was only available to users who registered Super Smash Bros. for Nintendo 3DS and one of Pokémon Omega Ruby or Pokémon Alpha Sapphire on the Japanese Club Nintendo between November 21, 2014 and January 20, 2015.

This game features Game & Watch games in two styles: Classic, which features faithful reproductions of the original games, and Modern, which gives the games a different visual style using characters from the Mario series. It features five games with both Modern and Classic modes, and six unlockable games with only Classic mode.

List of games
 Egg
 Green House
 Turtle Bridge
 Mario Bros.
 Donkey Kong Jr.
 Judge (unlockable)
 Flagman (unlockable)
 Lion (unlockable)
 Spitball Sparky (unlockable)
 Donkey Kong II (unlockable)
 Fire (unlockable)

The game also includes a museum feature, where the player can view screenshots of several Game & Watch games, including Game & Watch games that cannot be played in this game. The games listed include:

 Egg
 Donkey Kong II
 Pinball
 Donkey Kong Hockey
 Donkey Kong Circus
 Super Mario Bros.
 Climber
 Balloon Fight

The museum entries from the previous two games can also be unlocked.

Game & Watch Gallery 4
It was released for the Game Boy Advance in Europe on October 25, 2002, in the United States on October 28, 2002, and in Australia in 2002. It is also the first title in the Game & Watch Gallery series to credit TOSE as a co-developer, after the company had gone uncredited in the previous installments.

It was released on Wii U Virtual Console on December 10, 2015 in Europe, December 11, 2015 in Australia, March 16, 2016 in Japan, and April 7, 2016 in North America. The Wii U Virtual Console release was the first time the game was available in Japan.

This game features Game & Watch games in two styles: Classic, which features faithful reproductions of the original games, and Modern, which gives the games a different visual style using characters from the Mario series. It features 11 games with both Modern and Classic modes and nine games with only Classic mode. This game facilitates multiplayer for Boxing and Donkey Kong 3.

List of games
 Fire
 Boxing
 Rain Shower
 Mario's Cement Factory
 Donkey Kong Jr.
 Donkey Kong 3
 Chef (unlockable)
 Mario Bros. (unlockable)
 Donkey Kong (unlockable)
 Octopus (unlockable)
 Fire Attack (unlockable)

The game also includes a museum feature, where the player can view screenshots of several Game & Watch games. In this version, the games could be unlocked as playable in Classic Mode. The games listed include:

 Manhole
 Tropical Fish
 Mario's Bombs Away
 Parachute
 Bomb Sweeper
 Climber
 Safebuster
 Lifeboat
 Zelda

Game & Watch Collection series

Game & Watch Collection
Game & Watch Collection is a Nintendo DS game exclusive to Club Nintendo.

For members of the Japanese Club Nintendo, it was available for 500 coins from February 28, 2006. In Singapore, it was released at the AMK Hub in 2007. For members of the North American Club Nintendo, it was available for 800 coins from December 15, 2008. For members of the Australian Club Nintendo, it was available for 2500 Stars from March 11, 2009. For members of the European Club Nintendo, it was available for 5000 stars from November 12, 2009.

This game contains three Game & Watch games from the Multi Screen series: Donkey Kong, Green House, and Oil Panic. The games come with both Mode A and Mode B as well as the alarm feature, which can be accessed on the start screen. Unlike the Game & Watch Gallery series, the games contained in this one are exact replicas of the original versions.

Game & Watch Collection 2
Game & Watch Collection 2 is a Nintendo DS game exclusive to Club Nintendo.

For members of the Japanese Club Nintendo, it was available for 500 coins from September 5, 2008. For members of the North American Club Nintendo, it was available for 800 coins from March 31, 2010. For members of the Australian Club Nintendo, it was available for 2500 Stars from December 15, 2011.

This game contains two single-screen Game & Watch games, Parachute and Octopus, along with a new dual-screen game combining Parachute on the top screen with Octopus on the bottom screen. The games come with both Mode A and Mode B as well as the alarm feature, which can be accessed on the start screen. Unlike the Game & Watch Gallery series, the games contained in this one are exact replicas of the original versions.

Kanji Sonomama Rakubiki Jiten DS 
Four Game & Watch games are also hidden as Easter eggs in the Nintendo-developed Kanji training software Kanji Sonomama Rakubiki Jiten DS.

List of games
 Ball
 Manhole
 Judge
 Flagman

DSiWare
A handful of Game & Watch games were released on the Nintendo DSi and Nintendo 3DS as DSiWare in 2009 and 2011 respectively. They had extras like a highscore board, demo screen, and score select screen.

List of games
 Ball
 Flagman
 Vermin
 Judge
 Helmet
 Chef
 Donkey Kong Jr.
 Mario's Cement Factory
 Manhole

Clones and unofficial ports

In the Soviet Union, clones of some wide-screen console games appeared by mid-1980s; they were sold under the universal Elektronika brand. The choice of titles included Octopus (renamed Mysteries of the Ocean), Chef (renamed Merry Cook), Egg (renamed Nu, pogodi! with the Wolf resembling the main character from the animated series), slightly different variants of Egg named Hunt (featuring a hunter firing at ducks) and Explorers from Space (featuring a space ship being fired upon), and many others.

Before the Game & Watch Gallery series, the G&W Mario Bros. game was the only game ported onto a different system.  In this case, it had been unofficially ported over to the Commodore 64 system. Since the arcade game Mario Bros. had also been ported over to the same system, the similarly titled Game & Watch version had to be rebranded as a sequel, entitled Mario Bros. II.

Programmers have also unofficially ported G&W games to many platforms, most notably Microsoft Windows, mobile phones, web browsers (usually through Adobe Flash Player), and others.

See also
 List of Game & Watch games

Notes

References

 
Game Boy games
Nintendo Research & Development 1 games
Nintendo video game compilations
Video game remakes